Menzi Alson Masuku (born 15 April 1993) is a South African soccer player who plays as a winger for Royal AM.

International goals
Scores and results list South Africa's goal tally first.

Honours 
Orlando Pirates
Runners-up
 MTN 8: 2014

References

External links 
 
 

1993 births
Living people
Sportspeople from Durban
South African soccer players
South African Premier Division players
Orlando Pirates F.C. players
Dynamos F.C. (South Africa) players
Roses United F.C. players
Jomo Cosmos F.C. players
Chippa United F.C. players
Bloemfontein Celtic F.C. players
Royal AM F.C. players
Association football midfielders
2015 Africa U-23 Cup of Nations players
Footballers at the 2016 Summer Olympics
Olympic soccer players of South Africa
South Africa international soccer players